Santiago Grisolía García, 1st Marquess of Grisolía (6 January 1923 – 4 August 2022) was a Spanish biochemist.

Career
Born in Valencia, Spain, Grisolía studied at the University of Valencia, obtaining his doctorate in medicine in 1949 before continuing his studies at New York University, under Severo Ochoa. He later became a professor of biochemistry and biology at universities in Kansas, Chicago and Wisconsin.

Grisolía published over 400 scientific papers and was involved with numerous organizations in Spain and other countries. It is impossible to summarize such a large output in a few words, but some references give an indication of his work and publications, many of which were concerned with enzymes. Much of his first work concerned the biochemistry of citrulline, and he later worked on phosphoglycerate mutase, carbamoyl-phosphate synthetase and other enzymes.

Awards

He was appointed Grand Cross of the Orden Civil de Sanidad (Civil Order of Health) in 1984. He was further honoured when he was appointed Grand Cross of Civil Order of Alfonso X, the Wise in 1987. In 1992 he was appointed Grand Cross of the Order of Civil Merit. 

Grisolía was awarded the Princess of Asturias Award for Technical and Scientific Research in 1990. He was ennobled by King Juan Carlos I on 13 May 2014 as Marquess of Grisolía, in recognition of his work as a researcher and teacher and his contribution to science.

He died in Valencia in 2022 at the age of 99.

References 

1923 births
2022 deaths
People from Valencia
Spanish biochemists
Marquesses of Spain
University of Valencia alumni
Members of the European Academy of Sciences and Arts
Knights Grand Cross of the Order of Isabella the Catholic
Grand Cross of the Order of Civil Merit